Shake It Up may refer to:

 Shake It Up (Boney James & Rick Braun album), 2000
 Shake It Up (The Cars album), 1981
 "Shake It Up" (The Cars song), the title song
 "Shake It Up" (Divine song), 1983
 "Shake It Up" (Koda Kumi song), 2005
 "Shake It Up" (Selena Gomez song), 2011
 "Shake It Up" (Bad Company song), 1988
 "Shake It Up", a song by Elizabeth Daily from the 1983 film Scarface, included in its soundtrack
 "Shake It Up", a song by Pitbull featuring Oobie from M.I.A.M.I., 2004
 Shake It Up (American TV series), a U.S. Disney Channel original series that aired from 2010 to 2013
 Shake It Up: I Love Dance soundtrack, 2013
Shake It Up (Indian TV series), a 2013 Indian adaptation of the American series
 Shake It Up (Chinese TV series), a Chinese dance competition